is a city located in Yamaguchi Prefecture, Japan. The city was founded on March 31, 1954.

The interchange and the expressway is located in the east. Yanai is bounded by Hikari.

As of October 1, 2016, the city has an estimated population of 32,490 and a population density of 230 persons per km². The total area is 139.90 km².

On February 21, 2005, the town of Ōbatake (from Kuga District) was merged into Yanai.

Geography

Climate
Yanai has a humid subtropical climate (Köppen climate classification Cfa) with hot summers and cool winters. Precipitation is significant throughout the year, but is much higher in summer than in winter.

Demographics
Per Japanese census data, the population of Yanai in 2020 is 30,799 people. Yanai has been conducting censuses since 1920.

References

External links

 Yanai City official website 
 山口県柳井市観光マップ(Yanai sightseeing map: Yanai, Yamaguchi, Japan)

Cities in Yamaguchi Prefecture